KEEP is a commercially supported FM radio station serving the general area of Fredericksburg, Texas, due west from Austin and due north of San Antonio. KEEP is owned by J & J Fritz Media and is broadcast from Johnson City, Texas. It was one of four member stations of the Texas Rebel Radio Network which supplies Texas music programming. This programming is available as streaming audio via the KEEP/Texas Rebel Radio website.

On June 24, 2011, KEEP, after three months of silence, returned to the air simulcasting country-formatted KNAF-FM 105.7.

References

External links

EEP